Railway Union Sports Club is a multi-sports club based in Sandymount, Dublin 4, Ireland. The club was founded in 1904 and was originally known as the Railway and Steam Packet Athletic and Social Union. The club organises teams in various sports and activities including cricket, field hockey, indoor hockey, rugby union, association football, tennis, bowls and bridge. Railway Union women's field hockey and women's rugby union teams both play in the top level of their respective national leagues. Railway Union women's field hockey team also represented Ireland in the 2014 EuroHockey Club Champions Cup.

History

Men's field hockey 
The men's senior field hockey team plays in the Men's Irish Hockey League In 2018–19 they became founder members of the league's Division 2. The men's senior field hockey team also enters the Irish Senior Cup while the reserve team plays in the Irish Junior Cup.

Irish Senior Cup

 
Notes

Irish Junior Cup

Notes

Women's field hockey 
Railway Union's senior women's field hockey team play in the Women's Irish Hockey League and the Irish Senior Cup. During the first five seasons of the Women's Irish Hockey League, Railway Union emerged as the league's strongest team, winning three titles in fours seasons. During this era the team featured, among others, Cecelia and Isobel Joyce, Emer Lucey, Nicola Evans, Kate McKenna, Jeamie Deacon and Grace O'Flanagan. Railway Union were champions for the first time in 2009–10, before winning further titles in 2011–12 and 2012–13. In 2012–13 Railway Union also completed a national double, winning both the Women's Irish Hockey League and the Irish Senior Cup. In the cup final Railway Union defeated UCD 3–2. Railway Union also represented Ireland in European club competitions, including the 2014 EuroHockey Club Champions Cup.

Women's Irish Hockey League

Notes

Irish Senior Cup

Irish Junior Cup
Railway Union's reserve women's field hockey team play in the Irish Junior Cup. Cecelia Joyce and Kate McKenna were members of the 2018 winning team.

Notes

Men's rugby union
Railway Union's first and second men's rugby union teams both play in the Leinster League.

Women's rugby union
The women's rugby union first team plays in the Women's All-Ireland League. The second team plays in the Leinster League. In 2014–15, with a team featuring Cliodhna Moloney, the first team won the Women's All Ireland Cup after defeating Highfield 27–0. In 2017–18, with a team featuring Larissa Muldoon and Lindsay Peat, the first team won the cup for a second time. In the final they defeated UL Bohemians 33–3.

Women's All Ireland Cup

Cricket
Railway Union Cricket Club has five men's teams playing in Leinster Cricket Union competitions. The first XI play in the Leinster Senior League. There is also a women's team and boys' and girls' teams for all age groups. The men's first XI also play in the Irish Senior Cup and the Leinster Senior Cup.

Irish Senior Cup

Leinster Senior Cup

Association football
Railway Union's senior men's association football team play in the Athletic Union League. and in the FAI Junior Cup. They have previously played in the Leinster Senior League, finishing as runners up in the Senior Division in 1980–81. An under-20 team also plays in the AUL.

Notable players

Field hockey
 men's internationals
 Kenny Carroll
 women's internationals
 Jeamie Deacon
 Nicola Evans
 Sarah Hawkshaw
 Grace O'Flanagan
 A women's internationals 
 Emer Lucey
 women's cricket internationals
 Cecelia Joyce 
 Isobel Joyce
 Kate McKenna
  Republic of Ireland association football internationals
 Harry Cannon

Rugby union
 men internationals
 E.W. Jeffares; 1912–13 (2 Ireland Caps) 
 R.D. Patterson; 1912–13 (8 Ireland Caps)
 G.T. Hamlet; 1902–1911 (32 Ireland Caps)
 Jim William Golding; 1879 (Ireland v Scotland)
 women internationals

 women sevens internationals

Cricket
 men's cricket internationals

 women's cricket internationals
 Lara Molins
 Nikki Squire

Facilities
Railway Union Sports Club is based at Park Avenue. The facilities include a full size 6-rink bowling green, a floodlit astro field hockey pitch, three grass and seven floodlit all-weather tennis courts, two association football pitches, a cricket ground and a full size rugby union pitch.

Honours

Men's field hockey
Irish Senior Cup
Winners: 1929, 1930, 1931, 1938: 4
Runners Up: 1926, 1927, 1968, 1975, 2012: 5
Irish Junior Cup
Winners: 1925, 1957, 1975: 3
Runners Up: 1940, 1967: 8

Women's field hockey
Women's Irish Hockey League
Winners: 2009–10, 2011–12, 2012–13: 3
Runners Up: 2013–14: 1
Irish Senior Cup
Winners: 2012–13: 1 
Irish Junior Cup
Winners: 1977, 2011, 2017, 2018: 4 
Runners Up: 1966, 1974, 1976, 1978, 2008, 2009 : 7

Men's rugby union
Leinster League Division 2B
Winners: 2012–13: 1
Leinster League Division Three
Winners: 1995–96: 1
Leinster Junior Challenge Cup
Winners: 1920–21: 1
Leinster Junior League
Winners: 1937–38: 1
Kinsale Sevens
Winners: 1988–89: 1

Women's rugby union
All Ireland Cup
Winners: 2014–15, 2017–18 : 2
All Ireland League Division 2
Winners: 2013–14
Kinsale Sevens
Winners: 2012–13, 2013–14, 2017–18 : 2

Cricket
Irish Senior Cup
Winners: 2006: 1 
Runners Up: 2003, 2005, 2006
Leinster Senior League
Winners: 1960, 1962, 2011: 3
Leinster Senior Cup
Winners: 1967, 2010: 2
Runners Up: 1949, 1950, 1961, 1974, 1981, 1988: 6

References

 
Cricket clubs in County Dublin
Irish club cricket teams
Leinster Senior League (cricket) teams
Irish rugby union teams
Rugby union clubs in Dublin (city)
Women's Irish Hockey League teams
Men's Irish Hockey League teams
Field hockey clubs in County Dublin
Association football clubs in Dublin (city)
Athletic Union League (Dublin) clubs
Former Leinster Senior League clubs
Sports clubs in Dublin (city)
Sports clubs established in 1904
1904 establishments in Ireland